Amit Khatri, known mononymously as Amit, is an Indian racewalker who competes in the 10,000 m walk. He won the silver medal at the 2021 World Athletics U20 Championships held in Nairobi, Kenya.

See also 

 Heristone Wanyonyi
 Shaili Singh

References

External links 

 Amit at the World Athletics
 Amit at the Athletics Federation of India

2003 births
Living people
Athletes from Haryana
Indian male racewalkers
Athletes (track and field) at the 2022 Commonwealth Games
Commonwealth Games competitors for India